Mamuru River is a river of Amazonas and Pará states in north-western Brazil.

See also
List of rivers of Amazonas
List of rivers of Pará

References
Brazilian Ministry of Transport

Rivers of Amazonas (Brazilian state)
Rivers of Pará
Tributaries of the Amazon River